Partial list of rock formations in Serbia:

See also
List of caves in Serbia

Rock formations